The Pelion Range is a mountain range in the Cradle Mountain-Lake St Clair National Park, Tasmania, Australia.

The range is named after Mount Pelion in Greece. The Overland Track passes over the range through the Pelion Gap and consequently several peaks are popular walks.

The range is mainly composed of Jurassic Dolerite.

See also

List of highest mountains of Tasmania

References 

Mountain ranges of Tasmania
South West Tasmania